Andreas Haas (born 20 April 1982) is a German retired footballer who played as a striker.

Career

Haas played youth football for SV Reiskirchen, SG Erbach and 1. FC Kaiserslautern, before getting his chance in professional football with 1. FC Saarbrücken. He made his debut for the club in October 2000, aged 18, in a 2. Bundesliga match against FC St. Pauli, replacing Dino Toppmöller in a 2–2 draw. He made four more appearances during the 2000–01 season, but suffered an injury after just one game in the following season, and didn't play for FCS again, not featuring at all in his final year with the club, now relegated to the Regionalliga Süd. In 2000, he joined his hometown club, FC 08 Homburg of the Oberliga Südwest. He scored six goals in his first season with the club, but the next two years proved to be hugely successful – he scored 30 and 26 league goals respectively, both enough to make him the division's top scorer.

This form earned Haas a move back up to the Regionalliga Süd, with ambitious TSG Hoffenheim, but in six months with the club he only made one appearance – a 1–1 draw with SV Elversberg in which he scored. In January 2007 he joined FK Pirmasens, where his four goals in eight appearances could not stop the club being relegated from the Regionalliga. After a further six months with Pirmasens, he was back in the Regionalliga, joining KSV Hessen Kassel. At the end of the season he returned to Saarland, spending two years with SV Elversberg before being released in July 2010. After six months out of the game, he returned to FC Homburg in January 2011. He scored four goals in seventeen appearances for the club, but was unable to prevent them being relegated from the Regionalliga West, so he left in summer 2011 and signed for local amateur side FC Palatia Limbach. A year later he signed for SC Halberg Brebach.

In January 2013, Haas signed for SVN Zweibrücken, where he scored nineteen goals in seventeen appearances to help the club earn promotion to the Regionalliga Südwest. He returned to FK Pirmasens shortly after the beginning of the 2013–14 season, during which he achieved another promotion, scoring 19 goals, before dropping back down a level again to sign for Borussia Neunkirchen in July 2014.

References

External links

1982 births
Living people
German footballers
Germany youth international footballers
Association football forwards
1. FC Saarbrücken players
FC 08 Homburg players
TSG 1899 Hoffenheim players
KSV Hessen Kassel players
SV Elversberg players
2. Bundesliga players
SVN Zweibrücken players
Borussia Neunkirchen players
FK Pirmasens players
People from Homburg, Saarland
Footballers from Saarland